Jesús Alexander Mendieta Rojas (born 11 April 1998) is a Peruvian footballer who plays as a left-back for Peruvian Primera División side Ayacucho FC.

Career

Club career
In 2016, Mendieta was promoted to Sporting Cristal's reserve team and one year later - in 2017 - to the first team. However, he was not able to get his debut and he was then loaned out to Alianza Atlético on 24 August 2017 for the rest of the year. He made 10 appearances for the club.

In the summer 2018, he joined Ayacucho FC on loan. The loan deal was later extended for the 2019 season as well. Mendieta's contract with Sporting Cristal expired at the end of 2019 and he then joined Ayacucho on permanent basis.

International career
Mendieta was one of the figures of the Peruvian 15 national team that won the 2013 2013 South American U-15 Championship title in Bolivia. He finished as Peru's third top scorer with two goals. He was also a part of the U17 national team squad in the 2015 South American U-17 Championship in Paraguay.

References

External links
 
 

Living people
1998 births
Association football defenders
Peruvian footballers
Peruvian Primera División players
Sporting Cristal footballers
Alianza Atlético footballers
Ayacucho FC footballers
People from Lima